Rostki  is a village in the administrative district of Gmina Miedzna, within Węgrów County, Masovian Voivodeship, in aest-central Poland.

The village has a population of 220.

References

Villages in Węgrów County